Prior to human settlement, the mammals of New Zealand consisted entirely of several species of bat, and several dozen marine mammal species. Far earlier, during the Miocene, at least one "archaic" terrestrial mammal species is known to have existed, the Saint Bathans mammal. The Māori brought the kurī (Polynesian Dog) and kiore (Polynesian rat) in about 1250 CE, and Europeans from 1769 onwards brought the pig, mice, two additional species of rats, weasels, stoats, ferrets and possums and many other species, some of which cause conservation problems for indigenous species.

Indigenous species

 Three recent species of bats: the long-tailed, short-tailed and lesser short-tailed. Though they varied in range, Holocene fossils of all three species have been found near Cape Reinga / Te Rerenga Wairua at the far north of the North Island. The Miocene Saint Bathans Fauna showcases a considerably higher diversity of at least four mystacine species, a vesper bat and several incertae sedis taxa.
 Several dozen species of whales and dolphins including the small endemic Hector's dolphin
 Seven species of seal or sea lion
 The Miocene Saint Bathans mammal.

Conservation status
 The New Zealand lesser short-tailed bat is considered endangered (EN), whereas the New Zealand greater short-tailed bat is presumed extinct (EX) with the last sighting being in 1967. The New Zealand long-tailed bat is considered to be critically endangered (CR).
 The sei, fin and blue whales are all endangered (EN), as is the Hector's dolphin which is found only in New Zealand waters.

The Department of Conservation rank priorities for conservation with the New Zealand Threat Classification System.

Introduced species
The Māori introduced two species: the kurī (dog) and kiore (Polynesian rat). European settlers introduced all other mammal species.

See also
Fauna of New Zealand

References

Further reading